John Lang (19 December 1816 – 20 August 1864) was an Australian lawyer and was Australia's first native born novelist.

Early life and education
Lang was born at Parramatta, Sydney, Australia, second and posthumous son of Walter Lang, merchant adventurer, and his wife Elizabeth, née Harris. Lang was educated at Sydney College under William Timothy Cape. Lang went to Cambridge in March 1837 and, after qualifying as a barrister, returned to Australia.

Career
In 1842, at a public meeting, he seconded a motion proposed by William Wentworth, that the Crown be petitioned to grant the colony a representative assembly. A few months later he went to India and was successful as a barrister, taking on high-profile clients such as the Rani of Jhansi in her battles against the British East India Company.

Lang became a journalist and in 1845 established a paper, the Mofussilite, at Meerut. He also wrote some novels which appeared serially in the Mofussilite and in Fraser's Magazine. These began to be published in book form in 1853, The Wetherbys and Too Clever by Half both 1853, followed by Too Much Alike (1854), The Forger's Wife (1855, said to be the first English-language detective novel), Captain Macdonald (1856), Will He Marry Her (1858), The Ex-Wife (1858), My Friend's Wife (1859), The Secret Police (1859), and Botany Bay; or True Stories of the Early Days of Australia (1859). Some of these were very popular and were often reprinted, the twelfth edition of Too Clever by Half appearing in 1878. Botany Bay has been reprinted several times, sometimes under the titles of Clever Criminals, or Remarkable Convicts. Fisher's Ghost reprints 10 of the 13 stories of Botany Bay. Lang also published Geraldine, A Ballad in 1854, and in 1859 Wanderings in India and other Sketches reprinted from Household Words. Lang visited London in 1859, and was for a short time at Calcutta where he issued the Optimist. Lang died in the hill station of Mussoorie, India, and is buried in Camel's Back Cemetery, which enjoys a wide vista of the Lower Western Himalaya, which Lang loved greatly. His grave had been lost for almost a century until it was sought out and discovered by the writer Ruskin Bond.

References 

 
 Rory Medcalf, 'John Lang, our Forgotten Indian Envoy', The Spectator/Australia, 3 April 2010

External links
 
 
 

1816 births
1864 deaths
19th-century Australian novelists
Australian male novelists
19th-century Australian lawyers
People from Meerut
19th-century Indian male writers
Writers from Uttarakhand